The Zans or Chans are a subethnic group of  Kartvelian people, speaking the Zan languages.

 Kartvelian peoples
Georgians
Zans (Mingrelians and Laz people)
Svans

See also
 Kartvelian languages
 Zan languages

People from Georgia (country) by ethnic or national origin
Ancient peoples of Georgia (country)
Sub-ethnic groups
Peoples of the Caucasus